Vitaliy Shtun (born October 10, 1986) is a cross-country skier from Ukraine.

Performances

External links

1986 births
Living people
Ukrainian male cross-country skiers